Tillandsia harrisii is a species of flowering plant in the genus Tillandsia. The species is endemic to Guatemala.

Cultivars 
 Tillandsia 'Pink Velvet'
 Tillandsia 'Unamit'

References 

harrisii
Endemic flora of Guatemala
Plants described in 1987